Juan Saborit (born 6 May 1956) is a Cuban former hurdler.

References

1956 births
Living people
Cuban male hurdlers
Place of birth missing (living people)
Pan American Games medalists in athletics (track and field)
Pan American Games silver medalists for Cuba
Athletes (track and field) at the 1979 Pan American Games
Central American and Caribbean Games gold medalists for Cuba
Competitors at the 1982 Central American and Caribbean Games
Central American and Caribbean Games medalists in athletics
Medalists at the 1979 Pan American Games
20th-century Cuban people